Released July 1, 1986, Howard Who? is the first short story collection by science fiction writer Howard Waldrop.

Contents
 "Howard Who?" (introduction by George R. R. Martin) 
 "The Ugly Chickens" (Nebula Award winner)
 "Der Untergang des Abendlandesmenschen" 
 "Ike at the Mike"
 "Dr. Hudson's Secret Gorilla"
 "...The World, as We Know't"
 "Green Brother"
 "Mary Margaret Road-Grader"
 "Save a Place in the Lifeboat for Me" 
 "Horror, We Got"
 "Man-Mountain Gentian"
 "God's Hooks!" 
 "Heirs of the Perisphere"

References
 Howard Who? Doubleday (1986). 

1986 short story collections
Short story collections by Howard Waldrop
Science fiction short story collections
Doubleday (publisher) books